The Fairey FB-1 Gyrodyne is an experimental British rotorcraft that used single lifting rotor and a tractor propeller mounted on the tip of the starboard stub wing to provide both propulsion and anti-torque reaction.

Design and development
In April 1946, Fairey announced a private-venture project for a rotary-wing aircraft, to be built to a design developed by Dr. J.A.J. Bennett while he was chief technical officer at the Cierva Autogiro Company in 1936–1939. The Gyrodyne, constituting a third distinct type of rotorcraft and designated C.41 by the Cierva Autogiro Company, was in 1938 successfully tendered to the Royal Navy in response to Specification S.22/38 for a naval helicopter. Though preliminary work started on the project, it was abandoned with the outbreak of the Second World War, and G & J Weir, Ltd., the financiers of the Cierva Autogiro Company, declined to undertake further development in addition to their successful experiments with the W.5 and W.6 lateral twin-rotor helicopters. After the Second World War, the Cierva Autogiro Company was engaged with the development of the Cierva W.9 "Drainpipe" and the W.11 Air Horse helicopters under the direction of Cyril Pullin, and Bennett joined Fairey in late 1945 as head of the newly established rotary wing aircraft division.

The Gyrodyne was a compact, streamlined rotorcraft weighing just over 4,410 lb (2,000 kg) and powered by a  Alvis Leonides 522/2 radial engine, the power from which could be transmitted in variable ratios to the fixed-shaft/swashplate-actuated tilting hub-controlled rotor and the wing tip mounted propeller. The Gyrodyne possessed the hovering capability of a helicopter, while its propeller provided the necessary thrust for forward flight to enable its rotor, driven at low torque in cruise flight, to operate at low collective pitch with the tip-path plane parallel to the flight path to minimise vibration at high airspeed. Collective pitch was an automatic function of throttle setting and power loading of the propeller, which to maintain rpm diverted torque away from the rotor as airspeed increased.

A government contract to Specification E.4/46 was awarded for two prototypes with the first Fairey Gyrodyne exhibited as an almost complete airframe at White Waltham on 7 December 1946.

Testing and evaluation
On 4 December 1947, the first of the two prototypes took off from White Waltham airfield, and continued to build up flying time until March 1948 when it was dismantled for a thorough examination. The second prototype, basically similar to the first but with more comfortable interior furnishings befitting its role as a passenger demonstrator, was flying by the time of the next SBAC Farnborough Airshow, in September 1948. The first prototype was reassembled and, following further test flying, took part in an attempt to set a new world helicopter speed record in a straight line.

On 28 June 1948, flown by test pilot Basil Arkell, the Gyrodyne made two flights in each direction over a low altitude two mile (3 km) long course at White Waltham, achieving 124 mph (200 km/h), enough to secure the record. An attempt was to be made in April 1949 to set a 62 mi (100 km) closed-circuit record, but two days before the date selected a poorly machined flapping link in the rotor hub failed during flight and resulted in the crash of the aircraft at Ufton, near Reading, killing the pilot, Foster H. Dixon and observer, Derek Garraway.

The Gyrodyne had been selected for use by the British Army for use in Malaya, beating both the Westland S.51 Dragonfly (a licence-built Sikorsky design) and the Bristol 171 Sycamore, with an order for six approved by the Treasury at the time of the accident. Though the Gyrodyne's projected performance was significantly better than that of the Dragonfly, and was expected to be in service earlier than the Sycamore, the crash of the first prototype delayed the development programme and the Army, having no other choice, acquired three S.51 Dragonflies, followed by Sycamores at a later date.

Second prototype 

The second Gyrodyne was grounded during the accident investigation which determined flapping hinge retaining nut failure due to poor machining as the cause. The extensively modified second prototype, renamed Jet Gyrodyne, flew in January 1954. Though retaining the name "Gyrodyne", the Jet Gyrodyne was a compound gyroplane, and did not operate on the same principle as the original aircraft. It had a two-blade rotor manually controlled with cyclic and collective pitch mechanisms that acted directly on each rotor blade and was driven by tip jets fed with air from two compressors driven by the Alvis Leonides radial engine. Pusher propellers, one mounted at the tip of each stub wing, provided yaw control through differential collective pitch and thrust for forward flight. The Jet Gyrodyne was constructed to provide rotor drive and operational data for the Fairey Rotodyne compound gyroplane.

The Jet Gyrodyne is on display at the Museum of Berkshire Aviation, Woodley, Reading.

Specifications (Fairey FB-1 Gyrodyne)

See also

References
Notes

Bibliography

 Apostolo, Giorgio. The Illustrated Encyclopedia of Helicopters. New York: Bonanza Books, 1984. .
 Charnov, Dr. Bruce H. The Fairey Rotodyne: An Idea Whose Time Has Come – Again? (Based on Charnov, Dr. Bruce H. From Autogiro to Gyroplane: The Amazing Survival of an Aviation Technology. Westport, Connecticut: Praeger Publishers, 2003. .) Retrieved: 18 May 2007.
 Green, William and Gerald Pollinger. The Observer's Book of Aircraft, 1958 edition. London: Fredrick Warne & Co. Ltd., 1958.
 Taylor, H.A. Fairey Aircraft since 1915. Annapolis, Maryland: Naval Institute Press, 1974. .
 Taylor, John W.R. Jane's Pocket Book of Research and Experimental Aircraft. London: Macdonald and Jane's Publishers Ltd, 1976. . 
 Winchester, Jim, ed. "Fairey Rotodyne." Concept Aircraft (The Aviation Factfile). Rochester, Kent, UK: Grange Books plc, 2005. .

Gyrodynes
1950s British experimental aircraft
Gyrodyne
Single-engined pusher aircraft
Mid-wing aircraft
Aircraft first flown in 1947
Asymmetrical aircraft